There are three main railway stations in Brussels:

 Brussels-North railway station
 Brussels-Central railway station
 Brussels-South railway station